José Francisco dos Santos Júnior (born 15 May 1999), known as Júnior Brumado, is a Brazilian professional footballer who plays for FC Midtjylland in the Danish Superliga as a striker.

Career

Bahia
Born in Brumado, Bahia, Brazil, Júnior Brumado progressed through the academy of EC Bahia. He made his Campeonato Brasileiro Série A debut on 17 July 2017 in a 1–1 draw against Avaí. On 21 April 2018, he scored his first professional goal in a league game against Santos, after coming on as a late substitute for Marco Antonio to seal the narrow 1–0 win.

With Bahia club, Brumado participated in the 2018 Copa Sudamericana and contributed with a goal against Bolivian club Blooming on 24 May 2018. Bahia were knocked out in the quarter-finals by eventual winner Athletico Paranaense after a penalty shootout.

Midtjylland
On 30 January 2019, Brumado signed a five-year contract with Danish Superliga club FC Midtjylland for a fee reported to be DKK 16 million. Bahia had also secured a resale clause of 15 percent. He made his debut on 14 April in a 2–0 win over OB, coming on for Mayron George in the 77th minute.

On 31 January 2020, as part of a deal which sent Silkeborg player Ronnie Schwartz to Midtjylland, Brumado was sent to Silkeborg to replace Schwartz, on a loan deal for the rest of the season. He made his first appearance for the club on 16 February in a 2–0 home loss to AaB. His first goal for Silkeborg – as well as his first goal in the Danish league – followed on 9 March in a 2–1 win over AGF.

Ahead of the 2020–21 season, Brumado returned to Midtjylland. He scored his first goal for the club on 26 August 2020, which proved to be the winner in a 1–0 win in the UEFA Champions League qualifier against Ludogorets Razgrad.

He scored his first hat-trick on 3 October 2021, securing a 4–0 win over AGF. On 15 January 2022, he extended his contract with Midtjylland until December 2026.

Career statistics

References

External links
Profile at the FC Midtjylland website

1999 births
Living people
People from Brumado
Sportspeople from Bahia
Brazilian footballers
Brazilian expatriate footballers
Association football forwards
Campeonato Brasileiro Série A players
Esporte Clube Bahia players
FC Midtjylland players
Silkeborg IF players
Danish Superliga players
Brazilian expatriate sportspeople in Denmark
Expatriate men's footballers in Denmark